Poly Tin Kyriaki (Much on Sunday), later known as Pio Poli Tin Kiriaki (Even More on Sunday) is a Greek entertainment show on Mega Channel, hosted by showman Grigoris Arnaoutoglou and Marietta Hroussala and later Kalomoira.

In its first season, the show was called "Poli Tin Kiriaki" (Much on Sunday), a pun on the classic Greek film 'Pote tin Kyriaki' (Never on Sunday) and featured Marietta Hroussala.  But after a successful first season, the show was renamed, with the added "Pio" prefix in the title, making it "Pio Poli Tin Kiriaki" with Kalomoira coming in as the co-hostess.

Show Format
The show features a lot of audience interaction, as well as prize giveaways.  It also visits many parts of Greece, where different events are held. It often gives away cars, and other things of that nature.

On each episode there also are 3 contestants.  Those contestants have to answer various questions throughout the show in order to get the biggest number of points.  In the first season, the contestant with the biggest number of points was sent to a different part of the world.  Next week, they would have to answer questions, with the new studio winner in order to continue their journey around the world.  In season 2, the winner of each episode is given a ticket.  This ticket gives them a spot in the final episode against all the other winners, where they will compete for a grand prize.  The grand prize of season 2, is a fully paid trip to space by the show.

Show Mascot
The lovable show mascot is a live cow named "Clara".  She is featured in every episode, as well as the theme of the show.  Over the summer, Clara was sent to a farm where she became pregnant.  Since she is pregnant, she is not part of the beginning of season 2.
She lives at Attica Zoological Park.

See also
Mega Channel
Grigoris Arnaoutoglou
Kalomira

External links
  Official Website

Mega Channel original programming
2005 Greek television series debuts
2007 Greek television series endings
2000s Greek television series
Greek-language television shows